James Gibb may refer to:

 James Gibb (Australian politician) (1843–1919)
 James Brunton Gibb (1897–1968), Australian performer and teacher of elocution
 James Gibb (Presbyterian minister) (1857–1935), Presbyterian minister in New Zealand
 James Gibb (British politician) (1844–1910), British Member of Parliament for Harrow
 Jimmy Gibb, Northern Irish footballer

See also

Gibb (surname)
James Gibbs (disambiguation)
James (disambiguation)
Gibb (disambiguation)